Rudinka is a village and municipality in Kysucké Nové Mesto District in the Žilina Region of northern Slovakia.

History
In historical records the village was first mentioned in 1506.

Geography
The municipality lies at an altitude of 350 metres and covers an area of 3.137 km2. It has a population of about 391 people.

References

External links
 
 
http://www.statistics.sk/mosmis/eng/run.html DEAD LINK

Villages and municipalities in Kysucké Nové Mesto District